Klaus Emmerich may refer to:

 Klaus Emmerich (director) (born 1943), German film director
 Klaus Emmerich (journalist) (born 1928), Austrian journalist